The 1981 USC Trojans football team represented the University of Southern California (USC) in the 1981 NCAA Division I-A football season. In their sixth year under head coach John Robinson, the Trojans compiled a 9–3 record (5–2 against conference opponents), finished in a tie for second place in the Pacific-10 Conference (Pac-10), and outscored their opponents by a combined total of 284 to 170.

Quarterback John Mazur led the team in passing, completing 93 of 194 passes for 1,128 yards with seven touchdowns and five interceptions.  Marcus Allen led the team in rushing with 433 carries for 2,427 yards and 22 touchdowns. Jeff Simmons led the team in receiving yards with 28 catches for 543 yards and one touchdown.  Allen became the first player in NCAA history to rush for over 2,000 yards in one season. He also gained a total of 2,683 offensive yards, led the nation in scoring, and won the Heisman Trophy, the Maxwell Award, and Walter Camp Award and was also the Pac-10 player of the year.

Schedule

Personnel

Game summaries

Tennessee

    
    
    
    
    
    
    
    

Marcus Allen 22 Rush, 210 Yds, 4 TD (sat out most of second half)

Indiana

Marcus Allen 40 rushes, 274 yards

Oklahoma

Marcus Allen 39 rushes, 208 yards

Oregon State
Marcus Allen 35 rushes, 233 yards

Washington State

Marcus Allen 44 rushes, 289 yards

California
Marcus Allen 46 rushes, 243 yards

UCLA

George Achica blocked Norm Johnson's game-winning 46-yard field goal attempt in the final seconds to preserve the USC victory.

vs. Penn State (Fiesta Bowl)

Source:

Awards and honors
Marcus Allen, Heisman Trophy
Marcus Allen, Maxwell Award
Marcus Allen, Walter Camp Award
Marcus Allen, Pac-10 Player of the Year
Marcus Allen, All-Pac-10

1981 Team Players in the NFL
Marcus Allen
Chip Banks
Joey Browner
Keith Browner
Fred Cornwell
August Curley
Byron Darby
Jack Del Rio
Dennis Edwards
Riki Ellison
John Harvey
Michael Marper
Bruce Matthews
Don Mosebar
Jeff Simmons
Tony Slaton
Kelly Thomas
Joe Turner
Troy West

References

USC
USC Trojans football seasons
USC Trojans football